Joe Flood (born 28 July 1950) is a policy, data analyst and mathematician. He has made contributions to mathematics, housing and urban economics, urban indicators, slum studies, climate change and genetic genealogy at every layer of Australian government.

He worked in CSIRO from 1977 to 1993, where he conducted about 25 research projects for every level of government in Australia during 1984-93. His research contributed to several major changes in Australia’s housing policy. With university partners, he established the Australian Housing and Urban Research Institute (AHURI) in 1993.

Flood joined UN-Habitat in Nairobi from 1994–96, where he devised a system of urban indicators that was collected in over 250 cities around the world. He was the originator of the City Development Index and the Global Urban Observatory. After leaving the UN, he spent the next ten years on follow-up work on establishing local observatories and indicators, with some housing and urban work in Australia. 

From 2010 he has written and lectured extensively on genetic genealogy.

Early life 
Joe Flood is the eldest child of poet and playwright Dorothy Hewett, His siblings include Tom Flood and Kate Lilley. His parents eloped in 1949 from Perth to Sydney. Before and after his birth they lived in "Australia's last slum" Redfern. His mother wrote poems and short stories about him as a small child. His boilermaker father Les Flood suffered from untreated schizophrenia, and the family fled to Perth in 1958 as Les became increasingly dangerous.  

Flood completed a pure mathematics PhD in category theory and functional analysis at the Australian National University in Canberra in 1975, and wrote several other associated mathematics papers. To support his three children aged under four, he took a job as graduate clerk at the Bureau of Transport Economics, where he worked on a simulation of arid lands, dial-a-bus modelling, and a national rail wagon study. Here he learned computing, simulation modelling and data analysis.

Australian career 
In 1977, Flood joined the CSIRO Division of Building Research at Highett, Victoria. Initially he worked on modelling the housing market, but switched to housing policy in 1982. He was one of the first CSIRO scientists to apply for government projects at open tender, and subsequently won nearly 50 research projects on his own behalf or leading teams. His first project, with SIROMATH, examined the employment created by housing construction and the market-purchase of public housing, using multi-regional input-output analysis. The study showed that housing had the best employment multiplier of any industry sector, because of a high labour component and relatively few imports. It was used by advocates to promote spending on public housing.

His most influential project was the 1986 Housing Subsidy Study with Judith Yates, which enumerated about 200 Federal and State housing subsidy programmes in Australia. The study showed the subsidy system was unfairly distributed towards higher income earners and home owners, while private renters were receiving almost no support from government. Through the Cass Review, the Australian government then radically expanded Rent Assistance to low income renters. Rent assistance became after the mid-1990s Australia’s largest housing subsidy program, with an annual expenditure of over AU$5 billion in 2022. 

In 1988, Flood wrote several reports for the National Housing Policy Review. Up until that time public housing in Australia had been funded by loans from the Commonwealth. He pointed out this was not viable as tenants now had insufficient incomes to meet even basic operating costs and had no money for interest payments. The Commonwealth immediately converted all funding from loans to grants. 

In 1992, Flood won a large Commonwealth project to examine changes in internal migration. He found that employment had become a much smaller determinant of migration decisions than in the past, and quality of life had become much more important. With John Roy, he constructed an advanced model of internal migration. 

Flood completed other studies in piggery buildings, optimal replacement, industrial location and urban exports. He wrote the first Australian papers on the anticipated effects of climate change on urban areas.

He also provided input to several government inquiries during the period, assisting the House of Representatives and the Productivity Commission. In 1991 he was CSIRO’s representative on the Prime Minister's Economically Sustainable Development Task Force (Transport).

By 1993 he was a Principal Research Scientist and leader of housing research at CSIRO. With university partners he won a tender to establish the Australian Housing and Urban Research Institute, and he was appointed as Associate Director and the director of housing research.

Flood became interested in organisation theory and science policy in 1982, and wrote on the changing structure of CSIRO. He became an official of the CSIRO Officer’s Association from 1984–93, during crucial battles for science funding and reorganisation. He was elected national Vice-president of the CSIRO Staff Association in 1993. He was also President of the Australian Council of Professional Associations for several years.

He extended his industrial democracy work with CSIRO to a general participatory framework for indicators development, which he explored in 1992 during the National Housing Strategy. He used this system worldwide to develop policy indicators of different kinds, leading to a change in career.

International career 

In 1993, Flood was offered the position of inaugural Co-ordinator of the Indicators Programme at UN-Habitat in Nairobi. From 1994 to 1996, the programme developed a comprehensive series of urban indicators covering a range of pro-poor local issues - social outcomes, poverty measurement, infrastructure, housing and governance. The indicators presented an overview of progress in achieving the aims of the Habitat Agenda for the Habitat II Conference in Istanbul. The indicators were then collected in 1995-6 and in 1999 for more than 250 cities, with an emphasis on Africa. At the end of his tenure, the Global Urban Observatory network was established through a resolution of the Commission on Human Settlements.

Returning to Melbourne in 1996, he analysed the Urban Indicators data. He discovered that much of the variation in the data could be explained by a single index, the City Development Index, which is strongly associated with the level of development of a city.

From 2001-2006 Flood advised on the establishment of Local Urban Observatories in Ethiopia, Yemen, South Africa, Mexico and Iran.The most successful of these has been in Al-Madinah, Saudi Arabia, which was designed by Flood with the support of UNDP, It has extended to a network responsible for monitoring the Hajj pilgrimage.

In 2000-01, Flood managed two large commercial projects on local governance in the Philippines.

In 2003 he edited and partly authored the flagship UN report The Challenge of Slums, which contained a detailed global analysis of the situation in informal and low-income settlements. In 2004 he estimated the worldwide cost of upgrading slums at $200 billion for the UN Millennium Project.

Flood continued to work intermittently with UN-Habitat. In 2012, as part of a review of the Global Shelter Strategy, he examined the housing situation across the Pacific, including Australia and New Zealand. He developed a National Housing Strategy for Myanmar in 2017.

Later life 

In Australia from 1996 to 2010, Flood's work included institutional lending models, maintenance in indigenous housing, asset management, factorial ecology, and multinomial analysis of large housing surveys. In 2010 he re-visited work of Yates showing that home ownership continued to fall among younger households in Australia.  

From 2015-17 Flood was Research and Policy Adviser for Community Housing Limited, where he worked on an affordable housing project for Rwanda; the wind-down of the National Rental Affordability Scheme; alternative home ownership arrangements; homelessness policy; transitional housing; a furniture industry for Timor Leste; and active management of the housing stock. 

Flood has co-ordinated a large international Cornwall DNA group since 2011. He has written a book on Cornwall's history and the Cornish people. He gives talks and courses on DNA, and has written a number of articles on genetic genealogy.

Controversy 
Flood has been critical of Australia’s housing policy. In 1986, he showed that the popular federal program, the First Home Owner’s Scheme (FHOS), was counterproductive unless it was restricted to lower income earners, and might result in house price rises in excess of the amount given as a subsidy to home purchasers. Nevertheless, FHOS continued after 2000 and prices rose more strongly than ever.

In 2004 he became alarmed when the median house price to income ratio rose sharply in Australia, along with overcrowding indicators, while the rate of home ownership began to fall. Initially he attributed this to the increased availability of housing loans to landlords, who were outbidding first home buyers while writing off their mortgage costs against other income. Later he considered that falling global finance costs, and rapid immigration without the necessary supporting infrastructure spending, were also to blame. The practice of charging the costs of infrastructure to developers was also leading to steep residential land price rises in some States. In 2010 he completed an AHURI study showing home ownership was decreasing sharply among younger households.  He stated," The country that promised limitless land, cheap housing and near-universal home ownership to all comers now has some of the most expensive housing in the world." He was the subject of a flurry of media attention in South Australia, who were desperate to know if he was forecasting an imminent house price collapse.

Personal life 
Flood was married to arts educator and artist Adele Flood from 1972 to 2009, and they had three sons Benjamin, Daniel and Matthew.

He had a fourth son, Nathaniel Cervas, in the Philippines in 2002. Nathaniel developed Acute Lymphoblastic Leukemia in 2004, a cancer that had killed Flood's elder half-brother in 1950. Flood immediately brought Nathaniel to Melbourne for treatment, but Nathaniel finally died in Melbourne in 2010.

Flood was married to women’s cultural arts advocate and nurse Watiri Boylen from 2013 to 2021.

Publications 
Flood has published about 150 reports and papers, including:

Books and book-length publications 

 Free Topological Vector Spaces (University of Warsaw, 1984)
 Evaluation of the Impact of Housing Expenditure on Employment (AHRC, 1984)
 Housing Subsidy Study (AHRC, 1987)
 Financing Public Housing: the Need, the Options and the Risks (DCSH, 1989)
 Internal Migration Study (DITAC and CSIRO, 1992)
 Australian Urban Exports: An Assessment of the Current Situation (AGPS, 1993)
 Environmental Indicators for National State of the Environment Reporting. Human Settlements (DoE, 1998)
 Strategic Asset Management Best Practice for Indigenous Housing Organizations (ATSIC, 2000)
 Cities Data Book for the Asia Pacific (ADB, 2001)
 People’s Participation in the Local Development Councils (DILG, 2000)
 The Challenge of Slums: Global Report on Human Settlements 2003 (Earthscan, 2003)
 Housing Implications of Economic, Social and Spatial Change (AHURI, 2010)
 Unravelling the Code: The Coads and Coodes of Cornwall and Devon (Deluge, 2013)

Papers and reports

Mathematics and modelling 

 Pontryagin duality for topological modules (1979)
 Semi-convex geometry (1981)
 Optimal investment strategies for renewable facilities (1998)

Housing 

 Determinants of housing expenditure in Australia (1984) with Gary Butler
 Housing subsidies and income distribution (1989) with Judith Yates
 Housing subsidies 1990-91 (1991)
 China's housing policy 1950-2000: A successful urbanisation? (2003)
 Asset management in public housing in Australia (2005)
 Institutional investment in housing (1997) with Mike Berry
 Multinomial analysis for housing careers (2008)
 Global Shelter Strategy to the Year 2000. Review Oceania (2012) 
 Rental affordability and homelessness in Victoria (2017)

Demographics and urban form 

 A place for a village: development opportunities for inner Melbourne (1990)
 The determinants of internal migration in Australia (1991)
 Inter-regional migration modelling via entropy and information theory (1992) with John Roy
 Internal migration in Australia: who gains, who loses (1992)
 Urban densities in Australian cities (1993)
 Sydney divided: factorial ecology revisited (2000)
 Costing Target 11: monitoring slum improvement (2003)
 Neoliberalism and Australian cities: changes in urban outcomes 1975-2001 (2003)
 Sydney: understanding slums (2003)

Indicators 

 Housing indicators in Australia: a consultative method (1992)
 Monitoring Human Settlements Vols 1-4 (1994–95)
 Urban and shelter sector performance indicators (1995)
 Housing and urban indicators (1996)
 Urban and housing indicators (1997)
 Urban indicators for Thailand (2000)
 Analysis of urban indicators (2001)
 Indicators for Local Development Administration, Philippines (2001)

Environment 

 Greenhouse effect and road infrastructure (1990)
 Urban consolidation and the Greenhouse effect (1991)
 Costs and benefits of climatic change: some preliminary estimates for the built environment (1991)

Genealogy and population genetics 

 Using STRs for intra-family Y-DNA comparisons (2014)
 Coads of the border (2015)
 Miners of Perranzabuloe (2015)
 The phylogenealogy of R-L21 (2016).
 Haplogroup I1 in Cornwall: advance of the Northmen (2018)
 The Drakes of Devon: controversy at court (2019)
 Explosion from the steppe? the distributions and origin of the Y-haplogroup R1a (2019)
 U106 haplogroup in West Country Britain – the Frisian Diaspora (2020)
Other
 The advent of strategic management in CSIRO: a history of change (1984)
 Building materials for intensive piggeries (1989)

References

External links 
National Housing Conference, 2019. Speaker Dr Joe Flood

Academia, Joe Flood

1950 births
Living people
Australian mathematicians
Australian economists
CSIRO people
Regional scientists
Australian genealogists
United Nations experts
University of Western Australia alumni
Australian National University alumni
Writers from Perth, Western Australia